Kalleh Mazandaran Volleyball Club was an Iranian professional volleyball team based in Amol, Iran. The team was owned by Solico Group - Kalleh Company . They competed in the Iranian Volleyball Super League.

The Payambar Azam Arena in Amol, Iran was the home ground of Kalleh. The team has won the Iranian Super League twice and the Asian Club Championship once. Kalleh was dissolved in 2014 due to financial issues but was refounded just a year later.

History
In 1989 Kalleh Mazandaran Volleyball Club was established in Amol, Iran. Kalleh competed in the Mazandaran Provincial League until 2007 in which they were promoted to the Iranian Super League from the 1st Division. In 2012, for the first time in club history, Kalleh won the Iranian Super League title and secured a spot in the Asian Club Championship, in which they finished third. The following year Kalleh again won the Super League and this time won the Asian Club Championship for the first time in their history. first in 2013 To FIVB Club World Championship Climbed did.

Stadium
The team started construction on a private 10,000 seat stadium in 2014.

Notable former players 
  Rodrigo Quiroga
  Krasimir Gaydarski
  Smilen Mlyakov
  Stanislav Petkov
  Saeid Marouf
  Alireza Nadi
  Farhad Nazari Afshar
  Adel Gholami
  Mohammad Mousavi
  Vlado Petković
  Nico Freriks
  Farhad Ghaemi
  Farhad Zarif

Honors
 Iranian Super League
Winners (2): 2012, 2013
Runners-up (1): 2014
Third place (3): 2010, 2011, 2019

 Iranian First Volleyball League
Winners (1): 2009

 Asian Club Championship
Winners (1): 2013
Third place (1): 2012

 Club World Championship
Seventh place (1): 2013

  The Iran Cup
Winners (2): 2011, 2013

  Ramadan Cup
Winners (1): 1990

Management

Kit / Sponsor

References 

  Rosters

External links 

 FIVB Men's Club World Championship 2013

Sport in Amol
Iranian volleyball clubs
Sport in Mazandaran Province